Vidattalpalai is a small town in Sri Lanka. It is located within Northern Province.

See also
 List of towns in Northern Province, Sri Lanka

External links

Towns in Jaffna District
Thenmarachchi DS Division